The Real Is Back 2 is the eleventh mixtape by American rapper Jeezy, it was released on September 3, 2011. The Mixtape features guest appearances from Birdman, Freddie Gibbs, JW, Slick Pulla, 211, Scrilla, and Yo Gotti.

Reception 

Ralph Bristout of XXL said "Served as an appetizer to TM103, The Real Is Back 2 is full of that uncut raw from the famous Trapstar, supplying plenty big beats and signature birdplay. The real has returned." 

Phillip Mlynar at HipHopDX said "Beyond "Granted verse time on a quartet of tracks, the blend of Gibbs and Jeezy works stylistically, with the Gary gangsta's fleeter flow often flipping into double time and embellishing Jeezy's economic and guttural voice to smart effect. But too often Gibbs still sounds like a rapper yet to find the voice he's comfortable with. As singular in subject matter as Jeezy's trap raps can be, he always sounds like he believes what he's spitting, even when he's one-upping Kanye by claiming to use "Louis Vuitton toilet paper.""

Track listing

References

2011 mixtape albums
Jeezy albums
Albums produced by Mike Will Made It
Sequel albums